Myślice  is a village in the administrative district of Gmina Stary Dzierzgoń, within Sztum County, Pomeranian Voivodeship, in northern Poland.

For the history of the region, see History of Pomerania.

The village has a population of 490.

Notable residents
 Siegfried Thomaschki (1894–1967), Generalleutnant in the German Army during World War II.

Miswalde Church

Miswalde church dates from the second Quarter of the 14th Century and was extended in the second half of the same century. The church comprises a brick building with no chorus on a field stone base. The east gable dates from 1872 and the vestry is 19th Century.  The tower is thought to date from the 15th Century and is gabled on 4 sides with an eight-sided tent roof now covered with copper plates.
The church interior is largely ornamented in painted wood.
Other features include: Altar from 1706, carved by David Bröse from Elblag; Pulpit from the early 18th Century; and Baptismal font made of brass, 17th Century.

References

Villages in Sztum County